Bernard of Chartres (died after 1124) was a twelfth-century French Neo-Platonist philosopher, scholar, and administrator.

Life 

The date and place of his birth are unknown. He was believed to have been the elder brother of Thierry of Chartres and to be of Breton origin, but research has shown that this is unlikely. He is recorded at the cathedral school of Chartres by 1115 and was chancellor until 1124. There is no proof that he was still alive after 1124.

Contemporary accounts 

Gilbert de la Porrée and William of Conches were students of his, and some information about his work comes through their writings, as well as the writings of John of Salisbury.  According to John of Salisbury, Bernard composed a prose treatise De expositione Porphyrii, a metrical treatise on the same subject, a moral poem on education, and probably a fourth work in which he sought to reconcile Plato with Aristotle. Fragments of these treatises are to be found in John's Metalogicon (IV, 35) and Policraticus (VII, 3). Hauréau confounds Bernard of Chartres with Bernardus Silvestris, and assigns to the former works which are to be ascribed to the latter.

The earliest attribution of the phrase "standing on the shoulders of giants" is to Bernard (by John of Salisbury):

Doctrines 

Bernard, in common with others of his school, devoted more attention to the study of the Timaeus and the works of the Neo-Platonists than to the study of the dialectical treatises of Aristotle and the commentaries of Boethius. Consequently, he not only discussed the problem of universals (distinguishing between the abstract, the process, and the concrete—exemplified, for instance, by the Latin words albedo, albet, and album) but also occupied himself with problems of metaphysics and cosmology.

Metaphysics 

According to Bernard, there are three categories of reality: God, matter, and idea. God is supreme reality. Matter was brought out of nothingness by God's creative act and is the element which, in union with Ideas, constitutes the world of sensible things. Ideas are the prototypes by means of which the world was from all eternity present to the Divine Mind; they constitute the world of Providence ("in qua omnia semel et simul fecit Deus"), and are eternal but not coeternal with God. According to John of Salisbury, Bernard also taught that there exist native forms—copies of the Ideas created with matter—which are alone united with matter. It is difficult, however, to determine what was Bernard's doctrine on this point. It is sufficient to note that he reproduced in his metaphysical doctrines many of the characteristic traits of Platonism and Neo-Platonism: the intellect as the habitat of Ideas, the world-soul, eternal matter, matter as the source of imperfection, etc.

Cosmology 

Bernard argued that matter, although caused by God, existed from all eternity. In the beginning, before its union with the Ideas, it was in a chaotic condition. It was by means of the native forms, which penetrate matter, that distinction, order, regularity, and number were introduced into the universe.

Glosses on Plato's Timaeus

Paul Edward Dutton has shown that a set of anonymous glosses on Plato's Timaeus must be attributed to Bernard. These glosses edited by Dutton are Bernard's only extant work.

Editions
 The Glosae super Platonem of Bernard of Chartres, edited with an introduction by Paul Edward Dutton, Toronto 1991.

References

Sources

Further reading
 

12th-century French philosophers
Scholastic philosophers
1120s deaths
Year of birth unknown
12th-century French writers
French male writers
12th-century Latin writers